The Committee on Transport and Tourism (TRAN) is a committee of the European Parliament. Its current chair is the French MEP Karima Delli of the Group of the Greens/European Free Alliance.

Research service 
The Committee is directly supported by a research service, the Policy Department for Structural & Cohesion Policies. Most of its research studies and briefings are published online. The publications do not necessarily reflect the view of the Committee.

Recent publications (as of October 2018):

BREXIT: transport and tourism – the consequences of  a no-deal scenario

Transport and Tourism in Poland

Charging infrastructure  for electric road vehicles

Transport and tourism for persons with disabilities and persons with reduced mobility

Transport and Tourism in Greece

Road enforcement databases: economic feasibility and costs

Transport and Tourism in Ireland

European Tourism Labelling

Battery-powered electric vehicles: market development and lifecycle emissions

The “Scandinavian-Mediterranean Corridor” in the regions of Catania, Augusta and Naples

The new Silk Route – opportunities and challenges for EU transport

Odometer tampering: measures to prevent it

Infrastructure funding challenges in the sharing economy

Transport in California

Decarbonisation of EU transport

Health tourism in the EU: a general investigation

Road Transport Hauliers in the EU:  Social and Working Conditions

Passenger night trains in Europe: the end of the line?

Transport and Tourism in the Baltic States

Prospects for “Remote” En-Route Air Traffic Services

The EU Maritime Transport System: Focus on Ferries

Safe Integration of Drones into Airspace

References

External links
 Official homepage
 Research for TRAN Committee

Transport